Batchelder House may refer to:
Batchelder House (Pasadena, California), listed on the National Register of Historic Places (NRHP)
Batchelder House (Reading, Massachusetts), also NRHP-listed
Alden Batchelder House, Reading, Massachusetts, NRHP-listed
George Batchelder House, Reading, Massachusetts, NRHP-listed
Nathaniel Batchelder House, Reading, Massachusetts, NRHP-listed

See also
Batchelder's Block, Faribault, Minnesota, NRHP-listed in Rice County, Minnesota